Afrixalus crotalus is a species of frogs in the family Hyperoliidae. It is found in southern Malawi, central Mozambique, and eastern Zimbabwe. It might be a subspecies of Afrixalus aureus, a position adopted by the AmphibiaWeb. It is sometimes known as the Zimbabwe banana frog or snoring spiny reed frog.

Description
Adult males measure  and females  in snout–vent length. The snout is tapering. The gular disc is large and usually has small asperities. There are also minute asperities on the head; otherwise, the body has no asperities. Adults usually have a rudimentary mid-dorsal line and para-dorsal stripes. The headspot, usually present among the related species, is very weakly developed.

Habitat and conservation
Afrixalus crotalus inhabit moist savanna and shrubland at low to medium altitudes. Breeding takes place in ephemeral grassy pools, flooded grassland, and marshes. The eggs are laid in folded, glued leaves of vegetation at, and just under, the surface of water.

The species is abundant at suitable locations and tolerates some habitat modification. Some populations might nevertheless be impacted by spreading of agriculture and human settlements and by chemical control of mosquitoes. It occurs in a number of protected areas.

References

crotalus
Frogs of Africa
Amphibians of Malawi
Amphibians of Mozambique
Amphibians of Zimbabwe
Amphibians described in 1984
Taxonomy articles created by Polbot